The  is a four lane national expressway in the Tōkai region of Japan. It is owned and operated by Central Nippon Expressway Company.

Naming
Meihan is a kanji acronym of two characters. The first character represents Nagoya (名古屋) and the second character represents Osaka (大阪). Higashi (東) means east; together with the Meihan Expressway and Nishi-Meihan Expressway, it forms a corridor linking the greater Nagoya and Osaka areas.

Officially, the route is designated as the Kinki Expressway Nagoya Osaka Route, however this designation does not appear on any signage. In some areas, signs on the route are written in Japanese as 東名阪道 or ひがし名阪道; this is to prevent confusion with the Tōmei Expressway which looks similar when written in Japanese.

Route description

The expressway runs from Nagoya-nishi Junction in Nakagawa-ku, Nagoya to Ise-Seki Interchange in Tsu. The expressway is built to the same standards as most other national expressways, with tolls being charged according to the distance traveled. It has at least two lanes in each direction, with three in some sections.

History
The first section of what would later become the Higashi-Meihan Expressway opened to traffic in 1970.

List of interchanges and features

The exit numbers continue from the sequence of the Mei-Nikan Expressway, starting at 23.
 IC - interchange, SIC - smart interchange, JCT - junction, PA - parking area, SA - service area, TB - toll gate, TN - tunnel

References

External links
Central Nippon Expressway Company

Expressways in Japan
Roads in Aichi Prefecture
Roads in Mie Prefecture